The ISC license is a permissive free software license published by the Internet Software Consortium, now called Internet Systems Consortium (ISC).  It is functionally equivalent to the simplified BSD and MIT licenses, but without language deemed unnecessary following the Berne Convention.

Originally used for ISC software such as BIND and dig, it has become the preferred license for contributions to OpenBSD and the default license for npm packages. The ISC license is also used for Linux wireless drivers contributed by Qualcomm Atheros.

License terms 

When initially released, the license did not include the term "and/or", which was changed from "and" by ISC in 2007. Paul Vixie stated on the BIND mailing list that the ISC license started using the term "and/or" to avoid controversy similar to the events surrounding the University of Washington's refusal to allow distribution of the Pine email software.

OpenBSD license 

The OpenBSD project began using the ISC license in 2003, before ISC added the term "and/or".

Theo de Raadt of OpenBSD chose to retain the wording originally used by the University of California, Berkeley, which allowed free redistribution in either non-free or open-source software.

Reception 
In 2015, ISC announced they would release their Kea DHCP Software under the Mozilla Public License 2.0, stating, "There is no longer a good reason for ISC to have its own license, separate from everything else". They also preferred a copyleft license, stating, "If a company uses our software but improves it, we really want those improvements to go back into the master source". Throughout the following years, they re-licensed all ISC-hosted software, including BIND in 2016 and ISC DHCP Server in 2017.

The Publications Office of the European Union advises using the MIT license instead of the ISC License in order to reduce license proliferation.

The GNU project states the inclusion of "and/or" still allows the license to be interpreted as prohibiting distribution of modified versions. Although they state there is no reason to avoid software released under this license, they advise against using the license to keep the problematic language from causing trouble in the future.

See also 

 Comparison of free and open-source software licenses
 Software using the ISC license

Footnotes

References

External links 
 Internet Systems Consortium's License Text
 License template at the Open Source Initiative

Free and open-source software licenses
Permissive software licenses